Selkirk—Red River (formerly known as Selkirk) was a federal electoral district in Manitoba, Canada, that was represented in the House of Commons of Canada from 1988 to 1997.

The riding was created as "Selkirk" riding in 1987 from Selkirk—Interlake, Winnipeg North and Winnipeg—Birds Hill ridings. It was renamed "Selkirk—Red River" in 1990.

Selkirk—Red River consisted of part of the City of Winnipeg and an area to the east of that city.

The electoral district was abolished in 1996 when it was re-distributed between Churchill, Provencher, Selkirk—Interlake and Winnipeg North—St. Paul ridings.

Electoral history

See also 

 List of Canadian federal electoral districts
 Past Canadian electoral districts

External links 
Riding history from the Library of Parliament:

Former federal electoral districts of Manitoba
Selkirk, Manitoba
1988 establishments in Manitoba
1997 disestablishments in Manitoba